Stan Getz & Bill Evans (subtitled Previously Unreleased Recordings) is an album by jazz saxophonist Stan Getz and pianist Bill Evans recorded in 1964 for the Verve label, but not released until 1973.

Reception
The AllMusic review by Ken Dryden awarded the album 4 stars and states: "It is peculiar that Verve shelved the results for over a decade before issuing any of the music, though it may have been felt that Getz and Evans hadn't had enough time to achieve the desired chemistry, though there are memorable moments."

Track listing
 "Night and Day" (Cole Porter) – 6:45
 "But Beautiful (Johnny Burke, Jimmy Van Heusen) – 4:41
 "Funkallero" (Bill Evans) – 6:40
 "My Heart Stood Still" (Lorenz Hart, Richard Rodgers) – 8:37
 "Melinda" (Burton Lane, Alan Jay Lerner) – 5:04
 "Grandfather's Waltz" (Lasse Färnlöf, Gene Lees) – 6:28

Bonus tracks on CD reissue:
"Carpetbagger's Theme" (Elmer Bernstein) – 1:47
 "WNEW (Theme Song)" (Larry Green) – 2:50
 "My Heart Stood Still" [Alternate Take] – 6:45
 "Grandfather's Waltz" [Alternate Take] – 5:32
 "Night and Day" [Alternate Take] – 6:34

Personnel
Stan Getz – tenor saxophone
Bill Evans – piano
Richard Davis – bass (tracks 4–6, 9 & 10)
Ron Carter – bass (tracks 1–3, 7, 8 & 11)
Elvin Jones – drums

References 

1973 albums
Albums produced by Creed Taylor
Albums recorded at Van Gelder Studio
Bill Evans albums
Collaborative albums
Stan Getz albums
Verve Records albums